Batrachorhina albolateralis is a species of beetle in the family Cerambycidae. It was described by Waterhouse in 1882, originally under the genus Dioristus. It is known from Madagascar.

References

Batrachorhina
Beetles described in 1882